Mikheil Tsiklauri (born 8 April 1985 in Georgia) is a Georgian rugby union player who plays for  in the 2022 Currie Cup First Division. His playing position is prop. He was named in the  squad for the 2022 Currie Cup First Division. He had previously represented Krasny Yar Krasnoyarsk in the 2017–18 European Rugby Challenge Cup.

Reference list

External links
itsrugby.co.uk profile

1985 births
Living people
Rugby union props
The Black Lion players
Rugby union players from Georgia (country)